Hans-Voldemar Trass  (2 May 1928 – 14 February 2017) was an Estonian ecologist and botanist. He was a member of the Estonian Academy of Sciences since 1975 and president of the Estonian Naturalists' Society from 1964 to 1973 and 1985 to 1991. In 1992, Trass was awarded the Acharius Medal by the International Association for Lichenology.

Trass was married to Estonian actress Raine Loo. The couple had a son, composer and organist Toomas Trass.

Trass died on 14 February 2017, aged 88.

References

External links
Estonian Academy of Sciences
Citation for 1992 Acharius Medal  by Teuvo Ahti

1928 births
2017 deaths
20th-century Estonian botanists
Estonian ecologists
Scientists from Tallinn
Members of the Estonian Academy of Sciences
Acharius Medal recipients
21st-century Estonian botanists
Recipients of the Order of the White Star, 3rd Class